Robert Jay Daverman (born 28 September 1941) is an American topologist.

Daverman was born in Grand Rapids, Michigan, on 28 September 1941. He earned a bachelor's degree in 1963 from Calvin College and pursued doctoral study under R. H. Bing at the University of Wisconsin–Madison. After completing his thesis Locally Fenced 2-spheres in S3 in 1967, Daverman began teaching at the University of Tennessee–Knoxville. While on the Knoxville faculty, Daverman served on the American Mathematical Society's Committee on Science Policy. By the time he was selected as one of the inaugural fellows of the AMS in 2012, Daverman had gained emeritus status.

Selected publications

References

Calvin University alumni
20th-century American mathematicians
21st-century American mathematicians
University of Tennessee faculty
1941 births
Living people
Mathematicians from Michigan
Mathematicians from Tennessee
Topologists
University of Wisconsin–Madison alumni